WMBD-TV (channel 31) is a television station in Peoria, Illinois, United States, affiliated with CBS. It is owned by Nexstar Media Group, which provides certain services to Bloomington-licensed Fox affiliate WYZZ-TV (channel 43) under a local marketing agreement (LMA) with Cunningham Broadcasting. The stations share studios on North University Street in Peoria, with a secondary studio and news bureau on East Lincoln Street in Bloomington. WMBD-TV's transmitter is located on Pinecrest Drive in East Peoria, a section of Groveland Township, Tazewell County.

History
The station signed on January 1, 1958 as the third television outlet in the Peoria market after WEEK-TV (channel 25) and WTVH (channel 19, now WHOI). Airing an analog signal on UHF channel 31, it was originally owned by John Fetzer along with WMBD radio (1470 AM and 93.3 FM, now WPBG). All three stations took their calls from a local legend that President Theodore Roosevelt once described Grandview Drive (original home of WMBD radio) as the "World's Most Beautiful Drive". WMBD radio had long been a CBS affiliate, so naturally channel 31 took over the CBS affiliation from WTVH.

WMBD-TV shared it studios along with its radio sisters on the second level of what was then the Majestic Theatre. Fetzer had previously won a construction permit for VHF channel 6 as early as 1949, but those plans were shelved when the Federal Communications Commission (FCC) made Peoria–Bloomington an all-UHF market.

The WMBD stations were sold to Midwest Television Incorporated of Champaign (owner of fellow CBS affiliate WCIA) in 1960 for $1.85 million. In addition to sharing resources with WCIA, WMBD has also carried some original programming from the former. In the early-1960s, WMBD was the first Peoria station to broadcast color television. Along with WEEK-TV, it maintained a repeater, W71AE channel 71, in LaSalle in the 1960s and 1970s in order to expand its signal reach. The broadcast license for this low-powered outlet was granted on 15 November 1962. A picture of W71AE's  Rohn tower and its sixteen bay antenna is shown in a Rohn advertisement in the July 1, 1963 issue of Broadcasting.

WMBD moved to its current location on North University Street in June 1977 and still remains Peoria's only commercial television station with studios in the city itself. It became the area's first outlet to broadcast in stereo in September 1988. In 1999, Midwest Television sold controlling interest in its Illinois television stations to Nexstar. In 2001, Midwest sold its remaining interest in WMBD, WCIA and WCFN to Nexstar while the WMBD radio stations were sold to Triad Broadcasting.

On December 1 of that year, Nexstar and the Sinclair Broadcast Group entered into a local marketing agreement (LMA) in which WMBD took over WYZZ's operations. As part of the deal, WYZZ moved into WMBD's studios in Peoria. In August 2005, a similar agreement would be established between Nexstar's WROC-TV and Sinclair's WUHF in Rochester, New York. WMBD was the last station in the market to sign-on a digital signal and has been broadcasting digital-only since February 17, 2009.

On June 15, 2016, Nexstar announced that it has entered into an affiliation agreement with Katz Broadcasting for the Escape, Laff, Grit, and Bounce TV networks (the last one of which is owned by Bounce Media LLC, whose COO Jonathan Katz is president/CEO of Katz Broadcasting), bringing one or more of the four networks to 81 stations owned and/or operated by Nexstar, including WMBD-TV.

On December 3, 2018, Nexstar announced it would acquire the assets of Chicago-based Tribune Media for $6.4 billion in cash and debt. The deal—which would make Nexstar the largest television station operator by total number of stations upon its expected closure late in the third quarter of 2019—would result in the WMBD/WYZZ virtual duopoly gaining additional sister stations in nearby markets including Chicago (independent station WGN-TV) and St. Louis (Fox affiliate KTVI and CW affiliate KPLR-TV). (Ownership conflicts exist in two existing Nexstar markets involving Nexstar's duopoly of CW affiliate WISH-TV and MyNetworkTV affiliate WNDY-TV and Tribune's duopoly of Fox affiliate WXIN and CBS affiliate WTTV/WTTK in Indianapolis and Nexstar's virtual triopoly of CBS affiliate WHBF-TV, CW affiliate KGCW and Fox-affiliated SSA partner KLJB and Tribune-owned ABC affiliate WQAD-TV in the Quad Cities.)

Newscasts

WMBD presently broadcasts 27 hours of news each week (with five hours each weekday and two hours each on Saturdays and Sundays). The station does not produce morning newscasts on weekends.

In April 2002, WMBD established a news share agreement with WYZZ. The arrangement resulted in the launch of a half-hour, prime time newscast on that station that was jointly produced by WMBD. Known as Fox 43 News at 9, the broadcast was originally seen every night. At some point in time, the weekend edition of the newscast was dropped. The show did not have any direct competition in the time slot until June 5, 2006, when WEEK-TV launched its own weeknight-only prime time newscast on then-UPN affiliate WAOE.

On March 2, 2009, WHOI consolidated its operations with WEEK-TV. As a result, there was a noticeable increase in viewership on WMBD since this left the market with only two unique news departments that cover the area.

On May 7, 2015, beginning with the weekday noon newscast, the station became the first broadcast television station in the market to produce local news in full high definition. On the same day, WYZZ's weeknight 9 p.m. newscast was included in the upgrade and the station also began producing a two-hour weekday morning show for the Fox affiliate. Known as Good Day Central Illinois, the program can be seen from 7 to 9 a.m. and offers a local alternative to the big three networks' morning programs. In addition to its primary studios, it operates a Twin Cities bureau on East Lincoln Street in Bloomington (that were WYZZ's studios prior to entering into a LMA with WMBD).

On January 6, 2019, WMBD received a new graphics package and adopted the "Aerial" theme.

Notable former personnel
 Cheryl Burton (1990) — later co-anchor on WLS-TV in Chicago
 Colleen Callahan — agribusiness reporter (1974–1997)
 John Coleman — weather anchor, later founded The Weather Channel then went to KUSI in San Diego; died in 2018
 Faith Daniels — later news anchor for the CBS Morning News and The Today Show
 Bob Jamieson — from Peoria; later at ABC News; Jamieson School in Peoria is named for his father
 Jim Jensen — later at WBZ-AM/FM/TV in Boston then main anchor at WCBS-TV in New York City; died in 1999
 Paul Moyer — later anchor at KNBC in Los Angeles
 Randy Salerno — also worked at WHOI in Peoria; later at WGN-TV then WBBM-TV in Chicago, died in 2008
 Martin Savidge — anchor; now at CNN
 Dave Snell — from Pekin; still on WMBD (AM) as Bradley Braves men's basketball announcer
 Bob Starr (1960s) — later a sports announcer in Boston, St. Louis, and Los Angeles (died in 1998)
 Lisa Sylvester — later ABC News and CNN correspondent; now at WPXI in Pittsburgh
 Anne Marie Tiernon — reporter (1989–1991; now at WTHR in Indianapolis)

Subchannels
The station's digital signal is multiplexed:

References

External links
 

Television channels and stations established in 1958
1958 establishments in Illinois
MBD-TV
CBS network affiliates
Bounce TV affiliates
Laff (TV network) affiliates
Ion Mystery affiliates
Nexstar Media Group